The 2022 France Women's T20I Quadrangular Series was a women's Twenty20 International (WT20I) cricket tournament that was held in Dreux, France, from 5 to 8 May 2022. The participants were the women's national sides of France, Austria, Jersey and Spain. Spain played their first official WT20I matches during the tournament. Jersey won the series, after they went unbeaten in all four of their matches. France finished in second place, edging out Austria on net run rate, with Spain finishing fourth.

Squads

Points Table

Fixtures

References

External links
 Series home at ESPN Cricinfo

Cricket in France
2022 in women's cricket
Associate international cricket competitions in 2022
France Women's T20I Quadrangular Series